Rejštejn is a town in Klatovy District in the Plzeň Region of the Czech Republic. It has about 300 inhabitants. It belongs to the least populated towns in the country.

Administrative parts
Villages of Jelenov, Klášterský Mlýn, Malý Kozí Hřbet, Radešov, Svojše, Velký Kozí Hřbet, Velký Radkov and Zhůří are administrative parts of Rejštejn.

References

Cities and towns in the Czech Republic
Populated places in Klatovy District
Prácheňsko
Bohemian Forest